James Edward Fassel (August 31, 1949 – June 7, 2021) was an American college and professional football player and coach. He was the head coach of the New York Giants of the National Football League (NFL) from 1997 to 2003. He was offensive coordinator of other NFL teams, and as head coach, general manager, and president of the Las Vegas Locomotives of the United Football League.

Playing career
Fassel graduated from Anaheim High School and played quarterback at Fullerton College, USC, and Long Beach State.  He was drafted as quarterback in the 7th round by the Chicago Bears in the 1972 NFL Draft and had a short playing career with the Bears, San Diego Chargers, and Houston Oilers in 1972.

Fassel played briefly with The Hawaiians of the WFL in 1974,  and became an assistant coach during the 1974 WFL season. He left the WFL after the '74 season, but briefly returned when the Hawaiians needed a quarterback late in the 1975 season. He played in the final game of the WFL for the Hawaiians, throwing the last pass in the league's history as the WFL folded three days later on October 22, 1975.

Coaching career
Fassel's first professional coaching job was with The Hawaiians of the World Football League (WFL) in 1974, where he played quarterback before moving to the sidelines as an offensive assistant coach. He then began his college coaching career with stints at the University of Utah, Weber State and Stanford University, where he worked with John Elway. After five months as the offensive coordinator and quarterback coach for the New Orleans Breakers of the United States Football League (USFL), He was named head football coach at the University of Utah on November 30, 1984.

Before becoming New York Giants head coach, Fassel served as an assistant coach with the Arizona Cardinals, Denver Broncos, New York Giants, and Oakland Raiders.

Head coach of New York Giants
Fassel originally coached with the Giants as an assistant in 1991 and 1992. Three weeks after the Giants won Super Bowl XXV, he was hired by Bill Parcells as their quarterback coach. In 1992, he was promoted to offensive coordinator.

During Fassel's tenure as head coach of the Giants, his teams were known for numerous strong runs in December and for winning big games, such as a victory against the previously undefeated Denver Broncos in 1998. In 1997, he was named NFL coach of the year. He resurrected the career of quarterback Kerry Collins and received acclaim for his "playoff guarantee" in the 2000 season, during which he led the Giants to an improbable NFC Championship, ultimately losing to the Ray Lewis-led Baltimore Ravens in Super Bowl XXXV.

Fassel's legacy as head coach for the Giants is mixed. His Giants were known for their disappointments against inferior teams in the regular season, as well as in the playoffs. The most notable loss was a 39–38 loss to the San Francisco 49ers in the 2002 postseason, in which they lost a 38–14 third quarter lead. During the 2003 season, injuries decimated the Giants and he was fired amidst some controversy.

While coaching for the Giants, Fassel lived in Ho-Ho-Kus, New Jersey.

"The Playoff Guarantee"
In 2000, the NY Giants started off well but fell to 7–4. Under heavy criticism from the New York media and Giants' upper management, Fassel ad hoc'ed a famous speech that predicted a playoff berth that proved to be the impetus for a run at Super Bowl XXXV:

"This is a poker game, and I'm shoving my chips to the middle of the table, I'm raising the ante, and anybody who wants to get in, get in. Anybody who wants out can get out. This team is going to the playoffs, OK? This team is going to the playoffs."

Involvement in 9-11 recovery
Fassel and the Giants, on the way home from a regular season loss on the road, learned of the 9/11 attacks on the World Trade Center and Pentagon when they landed. With the NFL games suspended, Fassel was called by Mayor Rudy Giuliani to help morale at the Trade Center site. Fassel agreed and insisted that the team use its goodwill to help the recovery effort and provide assistance to the FDNY, NYPD and the City of New York. Under pressure from recovery crews to win the next game in Kansas City, the Giants went on to win an emotional game with respectful fans at Arrowhead Stadium.

Baltimore Ravens
Fassel joined the Ravens as an offensive consultant in 2004 to help with development of Kyle Boller.  He became the Ravens offensive coordinator in 2005.  Critics of Fassel have pointed to his lack of success as offensive coordinator after two seasons with the Ravens, in 2005 and part of 2006.  During that time, the Ravens ranked near the bottom of the league in offense.

On October 17, 2006, Fassel was fired as offensive coordinator for the Ravens.

Las Vegas Locomotives
In January 2009, Fassel was named coach of the Las Vegas entrant into the United Football League.  The Locos finished the regular season 4–2 and defeated the 6–0 Florida Tuskers in the first UFL Championship Game.

Fassel returned to the Locos in 2010 and helped lead the team to repeat as champions, again defeating the Tuskers in the 2010 UFL Championship Game. The Locos tried to three-peat in 2011, but this time fell to the Tuskers (who had since been relocated and renamed the Virginia Destroyers) in the 2011 UFL Championship Game.  Fassel was the only current UFL head coach who was active in the league since its inauguration and was the Locos' head coach when the league suspended play in 2012.

Broadcasting career
Fassel entered broadcasting following his firing as offensive coordinator for the Ravens, joining Westwood One radio as a color commentator for its Sunday NFL action. He stayed with the network for two seasons, calling Sunday afternoon games with Harry Kalas in 2007 and Sunday Night Football with Dave Sims. Fassel was also part of Westwood One's playoff coverage those two years, calling various games, and worked the 2007 and 2008 NFC Championship Games with Bill Rosinski (2007) and Marv Albert (2008).

Personal life and death
Fassel and his wife, Kitty, divorced in 2006 after years of counseling, but later reconciled and remarried. They are the parents of John Fassel, currently the special teams coordinator for the Dallas Cowboys. They had four other children. One was placed for adoption before they were married; they were reunited with him in 2003.

Fassel was good friends with fellow coach Mike Holmgren, dating to their days as USC quarterbacks.

Fassel died at age 71 of a heart attack on June 7, 2021, in Las Vegas, Nevada.

Head coaching record

College

Professional

See also
 History of the New York Giants (1994–present)

References

1949 births
2021 deaths
American football quarterbacks
Arizona Cardinals coaches
Baltimore Ravens coaches
Denver Broncos coaches
Fullerton Hornets football players
Long Beach State 49ers football players
National Football League announcers
National Football League offensive coordinators
New York Giants coaches
New York Giants head coaches
Las Vegas Locomotives coaches
Oakland Raiders coaches
Stanford Cardinal football coaches
USC Trojans football players
Utah State Aggies football coaches
Utah Utes football coaches
The Hawaiians players
The Hawaiians coaches
United Football League (2009–2012) head coaches
United States Football League coaches
Junior college football coaches in the United States
People from Ho-Ho-Kus, New Jersey
Sportspeople from Bergen County, New Jersey
Coaches of American football from California
Players of American football from Anaheim, California
American people of German descent